Argosy Glacier is a glacier about  long, flowing east through the Miller Range to enter Marsh Glacier north of Kreiling Mesa. It was named by the New Zealand Geological Survey Antarctic Expedition (1961–62).

See also
 List of glaciers in the Antarctic
 Glaciology

References 

Glaciers of Oates Land